The Hartford Steam Boiler Inspection and Insurance Company (HSB) founded in 1866 and headquartered in Hartford, Connecticut, U.S., is a global specialty insurer and reinsurer.  The company is the largest provider of equipment breakdown insurance and related inspection services in North America serving over five million commercial locations.

Hartford Steam Boiler subsidiaries include the Boiler Inspection and Insurance Company of Canada (BI&I), the largest insurer of equipment breakdown insurance in Canada and HSB Engineering Insurance Limited of the U.K., which provides engineered lines coverages and inspection services to clients in the UK., Ireland and other EU countries.

The Hartford Steam Boiler group is part of Munich Re, one of the world’s largest reinsurers. Munich Re completed its acquisition of HSB in April, 2009.

Hartford Steam Boiler Group is rated A++ (Superior) by A.M. Best Company. On July 24, 2019, A.M. Best Co. affirmed the ratings of the Hartford Steam Boiler group and its member companies.

Hartford Steam Boiler (U.S.) provides equipment breakdown coverage through a network of brokers and agents and also through other insurance companies who partner with HSB and who include equipment breakdown as part of their insurance products for commercial lines and personal lines customers.

Equipment breakdown insurance, also known as “boiler and machinery,” covers physical and financial damage that results from an accidental equipment breakdown to a range of equipment, machinery and technology.  Standard property coverages typically exclude perils of mechanical and electrical breakdown.  Equipment breakdown coverage was originally designed for business and industry.  In recent years, HSB has extended the product concept to the farm owners and home owners markets.

The company also provides a range of other specialty insurance products including insurance for identity recovery, data compromise, employment practices liability and miscellaneous professional liability that it designs and distributes through other insurance companies in reinsurance service agreements.

Hartford Steam Boiler employs over 1,200 engineers, inspectors and technicians, approximately 50 percent of its total workforce.

In March 2020, HSB announced its new logo and brand. The new autonomous HSB brand brings together HSB's three largest businesses - Hartford Steam Boiler in the US, the Boiler Inspection and Insurance Company of Canada (BI&I), and HSB Engineering Insurance in the UK - under one banner.

Early history

The Hartford Steam Boiler Inspection and Insurance Company was founded on June 30, 1866.  The company was conceived at a time when catastrophic boiler explosions were common events, one occurring about every four days.

Steam Power and the Industrial Revolution
Up until the 1850s in the United States, a great deal of manufacturing was carried on by small plants located in rural areas.  Water from streams and rivers was the source of power for equipment.  However, water power had reached the limits of its industrial capacity.  Manufacturers turned to steam boilers and engines.  The industrial revolution was underway.

The advent of steam power created a new industrial hazard – disastrous boiler explosions.  These tragedies occurred with increasing frequency with loss of life and property.  Though the potential of steam power seemed infinite, controlling the power and safely harnessing it was crudely developed.  As applications for steam power became more complex, the dangers became more acute.

In 1919, the Hartford Steam Boiler Insurance and Inspection Company got tired of paying the claims on all those broken boilers, so they came up with the idea of this special piping configuration and mandated it for anyone who wanted insurance on their steam boiler. Before long, everyone was calling it the Hartford (or Underwriters) Loop. The Loop had a very positive impact on the industry, according to the records of boiler failures before and after 1919.

Polytechnic Club Addresses Issue of Boiler Explosions
During this time, a group of industrialists and business leaders in Hartford, Connecticut, formed a group to discuss technical and scientific issues of the day.  This group, the Polytechnic Club, included Francis A. Pratt and Amos Whitney the founders of the Pratt & Whitney, and Elisha Root, president of Colt’s Patent Firearms Manufacturing Co., among others.

One of the founders of the Polytechnic Club was Jeremiah M. Allen, who would become president of The Hartford Steam Boiler Inspection and Insurance Company and the principal American figure to develop and apply the principle of combining boiler inspections with insurance.

References

External links
Hartford Steam Boiler home page

Financial services companies established in 1866
Insurance companies of the United States
Companies based in Hartford, Connecticut
1866 establishments in Connecticut
Companies established in 1866
Financial services companies of the United States
2009 mergers and acquisitions